JELD-WEN is an American company with its headquarters in Charlotte, North Carolina. The company operates more than 120 manufacturing facilities in 19 countries. JELD-WEN designs, produces and distributes interior and exterior doors, wood, vinyl and aluminum windows, wall systems, shower enclosures, closet systems and other components used in the new construction, as well as repair and remodel of residential homes and non-residential buildings.

History
JELD-WEN was founded in 1960 by Richard "Dick" Wendt when he, together with four business partners, bought a millwork plant in Klamath Falls, Oregon. The company first established operations to support their millwork business and later added other materials to its offering including fiber, vinyl, aluminum and steel.

During the 1970s and 1980s, JELD-WEN grew through vertical integration and acquisition. By 1989, JELD-WEN was ranked seventh among privately held companies in Oregon with revenues of more than $350 million.

Throughout the 1990s, JELD-WEN continued diversification efforts, moving into additional areas of service and expanding to new countries and continents. In 1996, Forbes ranked JELD-WEN at 225 of the nation's top 500 privately owned companies. In 1997, it was ranked 119 and revenues were estimated at $1.39 billion.

By the early 2000s, JELD-WEN was operating throughout the United States, Canada, Mexico, Chile, Europe, Australia, and Asia. JELD-WEN also diversified in to the home center business and began selling through big-box retailers.

JELD-WEN was recapitalized by Onex Corporation in 2011 following the housing market downturn. JELD-WEN went public through an IPO on the New York Stock Exchange on January 27, 2017. The company completed a secondary offering in May 2017.

Recent Acquisitions 
From 2015 to 2017, the company completed nine acquisitions, including DOORIA, Aneeta, Karona, LaCantina, Trend, Breezway, Mattiovi Oy, Milliken Millworks, and Kolder Group.

JELD-WEN Brands

JELD-WEN brands include JELD-WEN, AuraLast, MiraTEC, Extira, LaCANTINA, Karona, ImpactGuard, Aurora, IWP, Stegbar, Regency, William Russel Doors, Airlite, Trend, The Perfect Fit, Aneeta, Breezway, Corinthian, Swedoor, Dooria, DANA, A&L and Alupan.

See also
 List of companies based in North Carolina

References

External links 
 JELD-WEN (official website)

1960 establishments in Oregon
Companies based in Charlotte, North Carolina
Manufacturing companies established in 1960
Building materials companies of the United States
Window manufacturers
Klamath Falls, Oregon
Manufacturing companies based in North Carolina
Companies listed on the New York Stock Exchange
2017 initial public offerings